Karl von Prantl (aka Carl von Prantl) (28 January 1820 – 14 September 1888) (after 1872: Karl, Ritter von Prantl) was a German philosopher and philologist.

Biography 
He was born at Landsberg on the Lech. In 1843 he became doctor of philosophy at Munich Observatory, where he was made professor in 1859. He was also a member of the Academies of Berlin and Munich. Strongly in agreement with the Hegelian tradition, he defended and amplified it in Die gegenwärtige Aufgabe der Philosophie (1852) and Verstehen und Beurteilen (1877).

In these works, he emphasized the identity of the subjective and the objective for consciousness, and the fact that the perception of this unity is peculiar to man. He is more important, however, as a commentator and scholar, and made valuable contributions to the study of Aristotle. He published Aristoteles über die Farben (1849), Aristoteles acht Bücher der Physik (1857), and numerous minor articles on smaller points, such as the authenticity of the thirty-eight books of the Problems.

The work by which he is best known is Geschichte der Logik im Abendlande (4 vols.) (Leipzig: Verlag von S. Hirzel, 1855–1870) (History of Logic in the West). Christoph von Sigwart, in the preface to the first edition of his Logic, makes special mention of the assistance he obtained from this work.

Prantl died in Oberstdorf.

Bibliography 
 Carl Prantl - Geschichte der Logik im Abendlande (4 vols.) (Hildesheim/Zürich/New York: Georg Olms Verlag, 1997) (anastatic reprint of the original edition)
 Carl Prantl - Die Philosophie in den Sprichwörtern. München : Christian Kaiser, 1858.

External links 
 
  Carl von Prantl entry in the Allgemeine Deutsche Biographie, vol. 55, pp. 854–872, by Clemens Baeumker.
 

1820 births
1888 deaths
German philosophers
19th-century philosophers
19th-century German people
German logicians
German philologists
Ludwig Maximilian University of Munich alumni
Academic staff of the Ludwig Maximilian University of Munich
Bavarian nobility
19th-century German writers
19th-century German male writers